Fentress is an unincorporated community in Caldwell County, Texas, United States. According to the Handbook of Texas, the community had an estimated population of 291 in 2000. It is part of the Austin–Round Rock Metropolitan Statistical Area.

It was the setting for the novel The Evolution of Calpurnia Tate.

History
A settlement called Riverside was founded at the site in 1869. A Cumberland Presbyterian church was established there that same year. There was a cotton gin powered by horses built in Riverside around 1870 by Cullen R. Smith and Joseph D. Smith. Nine years later, it moved to the riverfront and was converted into waterpower, and was operated by family members until its closure in 1968.

In 1892, the community was renamed Fentress in honor of local doctor and landowner James Fentress, who also participated in the Battle of Plum Creek. A post office was established in 1893. It was originally a general store owned by W.A. Wilson, and he became the postmaster when it was opened. Mail was then routed between Luling and San Marcos. By 1896, the population was estimated at 150 and had a doctor and a blacksmith in its business directory. The Fentress Waterworks began operating in 1898, and the community had become electrified four years later. In 1900, a telephone company was established. Around 1904, the Fentress Indicator newspaper was published. A Methodist congregation was organized in 1905, and a church was built in the community four years later.

In 1915, the number of residents had grown to 300 and there were three general stores, a mercantile company, a meat market, a confectionery, a pharmacy, a gin, and a blacksmith shop. That same year, Josh Merritt and his partner C.E. Tolhurst created a resort with swimming and camping facilities including bathhouses, a waterslide, and screened tents with wood floors. The facilities were sold within two years and expanded under the new leadership. Dancing was permitted and a maple-floored skating rink was used for that. It greatly concerned local churches. A water tower collapsed onto the community's bank in 1918 and the cashier saved himself by running into a vault. It was only six years old and was viewed as divine judgment by locals.

The population peaked at around 500 during the late 1920s, as the economy benefited from local nearby oilfield activity that lasted for four decades. The Great Depression severely impacted Fentress, and the community had lost half of its population by 1940 to 250 residents. Fentress continued to decline during the latter half of the twentieth century, with most of the businesses disappearing in the 1990s. There was a hog farm that supplied pigs that performed in the Aquarena Center that disappeared at that time. By 1990, there were 85 residents, two businesses, two churches, a post office, a recreational facility that attracted campers and tubers, and a landing strip for skydivers. The population had risen to 291 by 2000, but was down to 86 in 2010.

After the death of President George H. W. Bush, skydivers in Fentress made the number 41 in the sky as a tribute to him.

Geography
Fentress is situated at the junction of State Highway 80 and FM 20 in southwestern Caldwell County, approximately eight miles northwest of Luling and 15 miles southeast of San Marcos. The nearest major city is Austin, located 42 miles to the north. Lockhart is located 11 miles northwest. It also stands along the San Marcos River.

Education
A one-room school building opened in 1895 and was open for three months each year. It was then replaced with a two-room school building in 1907. In 1922, a two-story, five-classroom facility with an auditorium was opened and replaced the two-room school building. It then shut down in the 1940s and merged with the Prairie Lea Independent School District. The community is still served by the Prairie Lea ISD today.

Notable person
 Scott H. Biram, musician

Gallery

References

Unincorporated communities in Caldwell County, Texas
Unincorporated communities in Texas
Greater Austin